Saint-Pé-de-Bigorre is a commune in the Hautes-Pyrénées department in south-western France. Saint-Pé-de-Bigorre station has rail connections to Bayonne, Bordeaux, Tarbes and Pau.

See also
Communes of the Hautes-Pyrénées department

References

Communes of Hautes-Pyrénées